Buni River (Indonesian: Ci Buni, Sungai Cibuni) is a river in southern West Java, Indonesia. The 109-km-long river flows in the Bandung and Cianjur regencies, with the upstream at the west slope of Mount Patuha and discharge into the Indian Ocean.

Geography
The river flows in the southwest area of Java with predominantly tropical rainforest climate (designated as Af in the Köppen-Geiger climate classification). The annual average temperature in the area is 18 °C. The warmest month is October, when the average temperature is around 20 °C, and the coldest is August, at 18 °C. The average annual rainfall is 3766 mm. The wettest month is December, with an average of 570 mm rainfall, and the driest is September, with 89 mm rainfall.

Hidrology 
Ci Buni is the main river in the watershed area (Indonesian: Daerah Aliran Sungai) Cibuni with a total area of 1,434.70 km2 comprising three regencies: Cianjur Regency, Bandung Regency and Sukabumi Regency. The upstream is located in Rancabali of Bandung Regency, then it flows to the southwest direction to Pasirkuda, Tanggeung, Kadupandak, and Agrabinta (all in Cianjur Regency) then turns to the southeast passing Sindangbarang, Cianjur, into Indian Ocean at the south coast of Java. The main tributaries of Ci Buni are:
 Cijampang
 Cilumut
 Cibangoah
 Cidolog
 Cikarang
 Cibalapulang
With the high rainfall between 2239 mm to 5579 mm, the river has high debit and large watershed area for the population to be the source of drinking water, irrigation and washing. Along the stream is a topical forest with diverse plants, fish, birds, boars, apes, wild cats and reptiles. Closer to the ocean, the river mouth widens to almost 200 m and hosts sweet water crocodiles.

See also

List of rivers of Java
List of rivers of Indonesia

References

Rivers of West Java
Rivers of Indonesia